Selma Gräfin von der Gröben (1856–1938), was a German feminist and philanthropist. She is known for her work for women's rights within the religious circles, is regarded as pioneer in social work and was involved in a number of social organisations.

Notes

1856 births
1938 deaths
19th-century German people
German baronesses
German suffragists
German feminists
German philanthropists
German women philanthropists
19th-century philanthropists